Picacho Mountain is a mountain located on the western side of the Province of Panama in the district of San Carlos. At the base of the peak there is a green lagoon named "Laguna de San Carlos" and the private mountain development Altos del Maria.

References 

 National Geographical Institution “Tommy Guardia"

Mountains of Panama